Robert Eric Irwin (born 8 June 1939) is an Australian naturalist, animal conservationist, former zookeeper, and a herpetologist known for his conservation and husbandry work with apex predators and reptiles. He is the founder of the Queensland Reptile and Fauna Park (now known as Australia Zoo). His son was the conservationist and well-known international television personality Steve Irwin.

Early life
Robert Irwin was born on June 8, 1939, in Melbourne, Victoria. He was a successful plumber from Melbourne who, in addition, had also spent time building sheds and houses.

Career
Irwin's career in animal conservation began in 1970, when Irwin moved his family from Essendon, located north west of Melbourne, to Queensland.

He had decided to turn his love for animals from a hobby into a career and purchased  of land to construct a wildlife refuge. As a builder, Irwin personally turned his hand to building and designing the Beerwah Reptile Park. Irwin dedicated so much time to constructing the Reptile Park and the enclosures that, for the first years in their new life of exhibiting native fauna, the Irwins lived in an old RV caravan. Irwin would build a shed, and then the Irwin house, which the Irwin family and Bob Irwin lived in until Bob gave the wildlife park to his son Steve.

Irwin also resigned from his role as manager of Ironbark Station at Blackbutt where he lived, moving to a new  property surrounded by forest and national park between Kingaroy and Murgon where he would continue his son's conservation work.

Irwin's memoir, The Last Crocodile Hunter: A Father and Son Legacy, was released on 25 October 2016.

Innovations
Irwin's foresight and innovation in captive care, breeding, and handling of native Australian animals set a new benchmark for wildlife welfare in Australia. Irwin was noted in the conservation sector for utilizing non-violent capture techniques which were then largely unemployed, such as proximity lassoing, hooding, trapping, and netting instead of the more common tranquilizers, chains, or other potentially harmful methods. Irwin would also come to strike bargains with the government, catching problematic or intruding crocodiles in Queensland and in return bringing them to the Reptile Park. Irwin, later aided by son Steve, personally caught and raised every crocodile in the Reptile Park, ultimately tallying over 100 crocodiles.

Personal life
Irwin married Lyn Hakainsson, a maternity nurse who was killed in a car accident in 2000. Together, they had three children, a daughter, Joy, son Steve, and a second daughter, Mandy. While Irwin made a living as a plumber, and Lyn as a maternity nurse, the family's consuming passion was rescuing and rehabilitating local wildlife. Steve, the couple's son, would not only come to fulfill the roles of curator and director of the Beerwah Reptile Park, but also produced and starred in his highly popular educational documentary series, The Crocodile Hunter.

Steve Irwin wrote on his website:What a childhood! My mum was the "Mother Teresa" of wildlife rehabilitation. Our house was a giant maternity ward fair smack-dab in the middle of the Beerwah Reptile Park. It was nothing for us kids to be sharing our house with orphaned joey kangaroos, sugar gliders, ringtail or brushtail possums, koala joeys, baby birds and untold amounts of other injured Australian animals. What a wild menagerie, and an exceptional household to be raised in.

Later, in 2006, Steve Irwin died after being pierced in the chest by a short-tail stingray.

Bob Irwin has since remarried to Judy, and was Queensland's Grandfather of the Year in 2008. Irwin and his wife live on a rural property near Kingaroy, from where Irwin continued to campaign for wildlife and environmental conservation through his foundation, Bob Irwin Wildlife & Conservation Foundation Inc.

On 2 March 2008, it was announced that Bob Irwin had resigned from Australia Zoo (the renamed Beerwah Reptile and Fauna Park) in order to "keep his son's dream alive". He thanked the zoo staff for all their support, with the notable exception of his daughter-in-law, Terri Irwin, with whom, according to zoo staff and volunteers, Irwin had an ongoing feud over treatment of staff, management of Wildlife Warriors and the commercial direction of the world-famous attraction.

On 12 April 2011, Bob Irwin was arrested and charged for contravening police direction as part of his civil disobedience actions against the Queensland Gas Company. He was protesting the construction of a gas pipeline. He faced court in May 2011.

On 1 July 2011, Bob Irwin announced he was considering challenging Labor incumbent Kate Jones and Liberal National Party leader Campbell Newman for the seat of Ashgrove in Brisbane. On 5 September 2011, it was reported that Irwin had become disenchanted with politics and felt he could best carry on his passion for animal conservation and fight against the coal seam gas industry from outside of the political arena.

In June 2018, Irwin announced his retirement, and his Foundation announced suspension of its operations, "... for the foreseeable future ...".

In June 2021, Irwin's granddaughter Bindi claimed that her entire life "has been psychological abuse from him." She also stated that Bob "never said a single kind word" to her personally", and had “shown no interest” in spending time with her or her family. Irwin denied these comments through a spokesperson not long after.

References

External links
 Bob Irwin, Artist of the Month

1939 births
Living people
People from Melbourne
Australian people of Irish descent
Australian conservationists
Australian herpetologists
Australian naturalists
Bob
20th-century Australian inventors
Zoo owners
Steve Irwin